State Route 171 (SR 171) is part of Maine's system of numbered state highways.  It runs  from an intersection with SR 169 in Prentiss to an intersection with U.S. Route 2A (US 2A) in Reed Plantation. SR 171 travels through Drew Plantation and the unincorporated community of Wytopitlock.

Junction list

References

External links

Floodgap Roadgap's RoadsAroundME: Maine State Route 171

171
Transportation in Aroostook County, Maine
Transportation in Penobscot County, Maine